Elk Ridge is a city in Utah County, Utah, United States.  Named for a herd of elk that wintered in the area, it is part of the Provo–Orem, Utah Metropolitan Statistical Area. The population was 4,687 at the time of the 2020 census. Elk Ridge became a fifth-class city by state law in November 2000.

Geography

Demographics

2020 census 
Demographic and housing characteristics data from the 2020 Census will be available May 2023.

2000 census
As of the census of 2000, there were 1,838 people, 413 households, and 401 families residing in the town. The population density was 662.2 people per square mile (255.3/km2). There were 441 housing units at an average density of 158.9 per square mile (61.2/km2). The racial makeup of the town was 94.99% White, 0.27% Native American, 0.22% Asian, 0.76% Pacific Islander, 2.29% from other races, and 1.47% from two or more races. Hispanic or Latino of any race were 3.26% of the population.

There were 413 households, of which 66.8% had children under 18 living with them, 92.7% were married couples living together, 2.4% had a female householder with no husband present, and 2.9% were non-families. 2.7% of all households were made up of individuals, and 0.5% had someone living alone who was 65 years or older. The average household size was 4.45, and the average family size was 4.52.

In the town, the population was spread out, with 46.1% under 18, 8.22% from 18 to 24, 25.8% from 25 to 44, 15.3% from 45 to 64, and 4.7% who were 65 years of age or older. The median age was 21 years. For every 100 females, there were 107.9 males. For every 100 females aged 18 and over, there were 103.9 males.

The median income for a household in the town was $65,511, and the median income for a family was $65,813. Males had a median income of $50,489 versus $31,667 for females. The per capita income was $18,513. About 2.5% of families and 4.0% of the population were below the poverty line, including 5.3% of those under age 18 and 2.2% of those aged 65 or over.

See also

 List of cities and towns in Utah

References

External links

 

Cities in Utah
Cities in Utah County, Utah
Provo–Orem metropolitan area
Populated places established in 1971
1971 establishments in Utah